Inès Arouaissa (born 30 June 2001) is a  footballer who plays as a goalkeeper for Division 2 Féminine club Olympique de Marseille. Born in France, she represents Morocco at international level.

Club career 
Arouaissa is a Marseille product, which she joined in 2016.

International career
Arouaissa made her senior debut for Morocco on 10 June 2021 in a 3–0 friendly home win over Mali.

See also
List of Morocco women's international footballers

References

External links 

2001 births
Living people
Citizens of Morocco through descent
Moroccan women's footballers
Women's association football goalkeepers
Morocco women's international footballers
Sportspeople from Dijon
French women's footballers
Olympique de Marseille (women) players
French sportspeople of Moroccan descent
Footballers from Bourgogne-Franche-Comté